Dame Lorraine is a 1981 play by American playwright Steve Carter. Set in the 1980s, it is the third of Carter's Caribbean trilogy. Dame Lorraine explores a family who has lost all of their sons, except one. The last son is returning from a long sentence in prison.

Original production
Directed by Chuck Smith
Produced by Victory Gardens Theatre
Set Designer: Thomas Beall
Costumes: Kate Bergh
Lighting: John Rodriguez
Opened: March 27, 1981 at Victory Gardens Theatre in Chicago.

Cast
 Jackie Taylor - Rene Moulineaux
 Linda Bright - Angela Moulineaux
 Vince Viverito - Salvatore Buongusto
 Esther Rolle - Dorcas Moulineaux
 Don Xerique Williams - Picton Moulineaux

Los Angeles production (West Coast premiere)

Directed by Edmund Cambridge
Produced by Los Angeles Actors Theatre
Opened: January 1983 at Los Angeles Actors Theatre

Cast
Denise Nicholas - Angela Moulineaux
 Thom Christopher - Salvatore Buongusto
 Esther Rolle - Dorcas Moulineaux
 Davis Roberts - Picton Moulineaux

References

1981 plays
Plays by Steve Carter (playwright)
African-American plays
Plays set in New York City
Fiction set in the 1980s